The discography of the English rock band the Who consists of 12 studio albums, 16 live albums, 27 compilation albums, four soundtrack albums, four extended plays, 58 singles and 23 video albums.

The Who have been with several labels over the years. In the United Kingdom and elsewhere outside North America, they were signed originally to Brunswick Records. In 1966, they moved to Polydor Records and took the rights to their Brunswick recordings with them. They created and moved to Track Records the following year with distribution by Polydor. They left Track in 1974 and returned to Polydor directly, remaining with the label ever since.

In North America, they were originally on Decca Records. They moved to Atco Records for one single in 1966 before returning to Decca later that year. In 1972 the US Decca label was absorbed into MCA Records. The band changed North American labels again in 1981, to Warner Bros. Records.  The label released Face Dances and It's Hard and their singles, before the Who disbanded. In later years, MCA would acquire the US rights to the Warner Bros. albums. In 2003, MCA Records (now under common ownership with Polydor, under Universal Music Group) was folded into Geffen Records. Geffen now controls the US rights to the Who's catalogue up through It's Hard. Their 2006 comeback album, Endless Wire, was released through Universal Republic in the US.

Studio albums

Live albums

Compilations

Albums

Extended plays

Extended plays

Soundtracks

Singles and other charted songs

Singles

Charted songs

Other appearances

Studio contributions

Live appearances

Guest appearances 
The Who performed the songs "Fire" and "Dig" from Pete Townshend's solo album The Iron Man: The Musical by Pete Townshend, which was released in 1989.

Videography

Film adaptations
 Tommy (1975)
 Quadrophenia (1979)

Documentaries
 The Kids Are Alright (1979) – UK: Platinum)
 Classic Albums: The Who – Who's Next (2000)
 Amazing Journey: The Story of The Who (2008)
 Sensation: The Story of Tommy (2013)
 Lambert & Stamp (2014)

Concerts

Other appearances
 Monterey Pop (1968)
 Woodstock (1969)
 Concert for Kampuchea (1980)
 The Rolling Stones Rock and Roll Circus (1996)
 The Concert for New York City (2001)
 The Concert for Sandy Relief (2012)

See also
Pete Townshend discography
John Entwistle discography
Roger Daltrey discography
Keith Moon discography

Notes

References

External links

 

Discography
Discographies of British artists
Who, The
Leeds Blue Plaques